A frame injection attack is an attack on Internet Explorer 5, Internet Explorer 6 and Internet Explorer 7 to load arbitrary code in the browser. This attack is caused by Internet Explorer not checking the destination of the resulting frame, therefore allowing arbitrary code such as JavaScript or VBScript. This also happens when code gets injected through frames due to scripts not validating their input. This other type of frame injection affects all browsers and scripts that do not validate untrusted input.

References

External links
 Internet Explorer Frame Injection Vulnerability - Secunia - updated 2008 archive
 Microsoft Security Bulletin (MS98-020) Updated: May 16, 2003

Injection exploits
Hacking (computer security)